West Islip High School is a public high school in the town of West Islip, in Suffolk County, New York on the South Shore of Long Island. It is part of the West Islip Union Free School District.

Curriculum

The curriculum at West Islip High School includes all academic areas, as well as art, business, music, and technology. 
Beginning in Grade 7, a sequential honors program is offered in English, social studies, mathematics, science, and world languages. Advanced Placement courses are offered in English Language and Composition, English Literature and 
Composition, US History, European History, Macroeconomics, Microeconomics, US Government and Politics, Calculus 
AB and Calculus BC, Statistics, Biology, Chemistry, Physics 1 and Physics 2, Environmental Studies, Computer Science, Studio in Art, as well as Italian and 
Spanish Languages. College courses in business, social studies, English, child development, and world languages are offered by arrangement with 
Adelphi University, Dowling College, Long Island University and Syracuse University. Beginning September 2010, the 
high school also offers the International Baccalaureate (IB) Diploma Program. In 2020 the high school was awarded the title of National Blue Ribbon School for its excellence in academics.

Athletics
The West Islip High School boys lacrosse team has won the NYSPHSAA Boys Lacrosse Championship in 2006, 2007, 2009, 2010, and 2012.

The West Islip High School girls lacrosse team won the NYSPHSAA Girls Lacrosse Championship in 2015.

The West Islip High School girls soccer team won the NYSPHSAA Girls Soccer Championship in 1989.

The boys baseball team since 2014 has won three Suffolk County Championships, and three Long Island Championships which were won in 2014, 2016 and 2017.

Arts

The high school offers various musical & theatre groups. Students can join or audition for multiple instrumental groups, include marching band, jazz band, orchestra, and others. Choir groups include chorus, select chorus, cantante, and the school's select show choir, Vocal Motion. Some of the instrument and vocal groups require auditions. The school's theatre department produces annual plays, one-act plays and a senior play.

Notable alumni
Matt Anderson, former NHL player 
A. J. Benza, gossip columnist and television host
Sal Caccavale, soccer player and coach
Thomas Downey, former member of the U.S. House of Representatives
Jarett Gandolfo, Member of the New York State Assembly
Sean Henry, NHL administrator
Rick Lazio, former member of the U.S. House of Representatives 
Al Oerter, Olympic discus throw champion
Doug Seegers, country musician
Gary Sullivan, soccer player
Ken Marino, actor, comedian, director, and screenwriter
Nick Tropeano, MLB pitcher
Bob Wenzel, former NBA coach and broadcaster

Community

West Islip High School services all of West Islip and parts of Bay Shore. The hamlet, West Islip, is part of the Town of Islip in Suffolk County.

References

Public high schools in New York (state)
Schools in Suffolk County, New York